Spack is a surname. Notable people with the surname include:

Brock Spack (born 1962), American football coach
Daniel Spack, American musician
Norman Spack, American pediatric endocrinologist

See also
Spach